Larisa Neiland and Helena Suková were the defending champions but only Neiland competed that year with Elena Tatarkova.

Neiland and Tatarkova lost the final 6–7, 6–3, 2–0 after they were forced to retire against Elena Likhovtseva and Ai Sugiyama.

Seeds
Champion seeds are indicated in bold text while text in italics indicates the round in which those seeds were eliminated.

 Alexandra Fusai /  Nathalie Tauziat (first round)
 Larisa Neiland /  Elena Tatarkova (final)
 Elena Likhovtseva /  Ai Sugiyama (champions)
 Sabine Appelmans /  Miriam Oremans (quarterfinals)

Draw

External links
 1998 SEAT Open Doubles Draw

SEAT Open
Luxembourg Open
1998 in Luxembourgian tennis